Bloemfontein City Commando was a light infantry regiment of the South African Army. It formed part of the South African Infantry Corps as well as the South African Territorial Reserve.

History

Origin

With the Orange River Sovereignty
On , Sir Harry Smith issued a proclamation to activate a militia for the Sovereignty. From this, three military districts, namely Bloemfontein, Caledon River and Winburg, were formed.

With the Orange Free State Republic
With the departure of the British and proclamation of the Republic in 1854, the commandos were retained and regular shooting exercises were held in the districts.

Basotho Wars
Andries Pretorius called up a commando of about 1000 men from the regions of Bloemfontein, Caledon River and Winburg to defend the region against Basotho cattle theft.

Anglo Boer War

During the guerilla phase of the war, the commando raided its own city's infrastructure under British control, namely Bloemfontein's water works.

With the UDF
From 1902, all remnants of commandos had been placed under British military control and disarmed. By 1912 the commando existed solely as Shooting Association.

By 1940, this commando fell under the National Reserve of Volunteers.

The commando was reactivated formally around 1948.

By 1956 however, the unit was divided into two separate commandos one for the city and one for the rural areas, Bloemfontein District Commando.

With the SADF
From 1968, the unit was being used in assisting urban policing.

By 1978, Bloemfontein City Commando had a platoon mainly made up of colored employees of the Musgrave weapons factory and by 1980 had a complement of around 30 men led by a white officer.

The unit was also used in the training of drivers for heavy trucks as well as securing the Lesotho border.

The unit conducted several tours in the South West African operational area around 1976 to 1982, but was mainly responsible for internal security and protection especially during the unrest in the 1980s.

The unit fell under the command of the SADF's Group 35.

With the SANDF
From 1994, the unit trained approximately 3000 coloured and black soldiers for the new Defence Force.

In 1998, the unit celebrated its 150th anniversary with a Colours parade at Tempe Stadium.

Disbandment
This unit, along with all other Commando units was disbanded after a decision by South African President Thabo Mbeki to disband all Commando Units. The Commando system was phased out between 2003 and 2008 "because of the role it played in the apartheid era", according to the Minister of Safety and Security Charles Nqakula.

Unit Insignia

Leadership

See also 

 South African Commando System

References

Infantry regiments of South Africa
South African Commando Units
Disbanded military units and formations in Bloemfontein